Walter Alexander McKenzie (18 February 1879 – 9 February 1931) was an Australian rules footballer who played with Carlton in the Victorian Football League (VFL).

Notes

External links 

Wal McKenzie's profile at Blueseum	

1879 births
Australian rules footballers from Victoria (Australia)
Carlton Football Club players
1931 deaths